Sun Fen (before 235 - 270), courtesy name Ziyang, was an imperial prince of the state of Eastern Wu during the Three Kingdoms period of China. He was the fifth son of Sun Quan, the founding emperor of Eastern Wu.

Life
Sun Fen was the fifth son of Sun Quan, a warlord who lived in the late Eastern Han dynasty and became the founding emperor of the Eastern Wu state in the Three Kingdoms period. His mother was Consort Zhong (仲姬), a concubine of Sun Quan. In late January or February 252, he received the noble title "Prince of Qi" (齊王) and took up residence in Wuchang (武昌; present-day Ezhou, Hubei).

Following Sun Quan's death in May 252, the Grand Tutor Zhuge Ke, who had been appointed regent for Sun Quan's youngest son and successor, Sun Liang, proposed to the imperial court to move the nobles away from areas with a heavy military presence. He thus relocated Sun Fen from Wuchang to Yuzhang Commandery (豫章郡; around present-day Nanchang, Jiangxi). However, Sun Fen turned furious when he heard about it and refused to move out of Wuchang. Zhuge Ke wrote a long letter to Sun Fen to warn him about the perils of not knowing his place and to remind him of the downfall of his fourth brother, Sun Ba, the Prince of Lu.

Sun Fen became fearful after reading Zhuge Ke's letter so he meekly obliged and moved to Nanchang, the capital of Yuzhang Commandery. While he was in Yuzhang Commandery, he led such a carefree and extravagant lifestyle that the officials around him could not stand him. When he heard that Zhuge Ke had been ousted from power in a coup d'état in 253, he travelled to Wuhu County (蕪湖縣; east of present-day Wuhu, Anhui) and wanted to enter the imperial capital, Jianye (present-day Nanjing, Jiangsu), to observe the situation in the imperial court. When a senior official Xie Ci (謝慈) tried to dissuade him from doing so, Sun Fen had him executed. Sun Fen was subsequently stripped of his noble title and reduced to commoner status as punishment for executing a senior official without permission from the imperial court. He was also relocated to Zhang'an County (章安縣; present-day Jiaojiang District, Taizhou, Zhejiang). However, in August or September 258, the emperor Sun Liang issued an imperial decree to pardon Sun Fen for his earlier offence and restore him to noble status as the Marquis of Zhang'an (章安侯).

In 270, the emperor Sun Hao was deeply grieved when his favourite concubine, Lady Wang, died of illness, so he remained indoors for many months and refused to meet his subjects. At the time, there were rumours that Sun Hao was dead and that either Sun Fen or Sun Feng (孫奉; a grandson of Sun Ce, via Ce's son Sun Shao) would become the new emperor. Zhang Jun (張俊), the Administrator of Yuzhang Commandery, believed the rumours and hoped that Sun Fen would become the new emperor, so he sent his men to clean up the tomb of Lady Zhong (Sun Fen's mother) in Yuzhang Commandery in an attempt to please Sun Fen. When Sun Hao found out, he was so angry that he had Zhang Jun arrested and executed by dismemberment. Zhang Jun's family members were also put to death. Sun Fen and his family were implicated, arrested and condemned to death. When he pleaded with Sun Hao to spare him and his five sons and allow them to live the rest of their lives as beggars, Sun Hao refused and forced them to commit suicide by consuming poison.

See also
 Lists of people of the Three Kingdoms
 Eastern Wu family trees

References

 Chen, Shou (3rd century). Records of the Three Kingdoms (Sanguozhi).
 Pei, Songzhi (5th century). Annotations to Records of the Three Kingdoms (Sanguozhi zhu).

Year of birth unknown
270 deaths
Eastern Wu imperial princes
Suicides in Eastern Wu
Family of Sun Quan